Leonardo Chapman Medina (April 30, 1922 – October 20, 1974) was a Puerto Rican first baseman in the Negro leagues in the 1940s.

A native of Puerta de Tierra, Puerto Rico, Chapman played for the Baltimore Elite Giants in 1944. In 11 recorded games, he posted seven hits in 42 plate appearances. Chapman died in San Juan, Puerto Rico in 1974 at age 52.

References

External links
 and Seamheads

1922 births
1974 deaths
Baltimore Elite Giants players
Puerto Rican baseball players
Baseball first basemen
Sportspeople from San Juan, Puerto Rico